The 2014 AFC Futsal Championship qualification is held in late 2013 to determine 12 spots to the final tournament in Vietnam. The teams finishing first, second and third in the 2012 AFC Futsal Championship, and Vietnam, the host nation for the 2014 competition, receive automatic byes to the Finals.

Format
Twenty-four teams registered in qualifying action for 12 places in the finals. Reigning champions Japan, runners-up Thailand, Iran and 2014 edition hosts Vietnam had direct entry into the tournament proper. The qualification process was divided into four zones: ASEAN Zone, which doubled as the 2013 AFF Futsal Championship, Central & South Zone, East Zone, and West Zone. The top three of each zone qualified for the 2014 AFC Futsal Championship.

Qualified teams

Zones

ASEAN

Matches played in Thailand from October 19 to October 27, 2013.
All times are Thailand Time – UTC+7.

Group stage

Group A

Group B

Knockout stage

Semi-finals

Third place play-off

Final

East
All times are Vietnam Time – UTC+7.

South & Central
All times are Uzbekistan Time – UTC+5.

West
The matches will be played in Malaysia from December 8 to December 12, 2013.
All times are Malaysia Time – UTC+8.

References

External links
AFC Futsal Championship, the-AFC.com

2014 qualification
qualification
International futsal competitions hosted by Thailand
International futsal competitions hosted by Malaysia
International futsal competitions hosted by Vietnam
International futsal competitions hosted by Uzbekistan